Ubonrak Thonburi is a hospital in Ubon Ratchathani province, Thailand. It is part of a larger chain of hospitals under the name of Thon Buri medical services. The hospital opened in 1996, and provides medical care to residents of Ubon Ratchathani, surrounding provinces of Thailand, Laos and Cambodia.

It belongs to Ubonrak Company Limited and has 290 employees. It is a subsidiary of Thonburi Healthcare Group.

The hospital provides 24-hour emergency response and has Dental, Orthopedics, Pediatric and Kidney departments, as well as Labour and Child room. It provides MRI and 4D Ultrasound imaging. Medical consultations are offered in English, Thai and Lao languages. 

Ubonrak hospital provides vaccinations for Lao citizens.

See also

List of hospitals in Thailand
International healthcare accreditation
Medical tourism
Asian Hospital and Medical Center

References

External links
Ubonrak Thonburi Hospital

Hospital buildings completed in 1996
Private hospitals in Thailand
Hospitals established in 1996
1996 establishments in Thailand